Trade Unionist and Socialist Coalition (TUSC) is a socialist electoral alliance launched in Britain for the 2010 general election.

TUSC's co-founder was the RMT union general secretary Bob Crow. Members of the PCS, NUT, FBU and POA unions are on the steering committee. The biggest component section of TUSC was the RMT until they disaffiliated at the 2022 RMT AGM. The most prominent participating political groups are the Socialist Party and the Resistance Movement. TUSC stood 135 (parliamentary) candidates across England, Wales and Scotland at the 2015 general election and 619 the same day in local government elections.

Following the election of Jeremy Corbyn as leader of the Labour Party, TUSC did not stand candidates in the 2017 UK general election and suspended electoral activity in November 2018. In July 2020, the Socialist Party called for the relaunch of the alliance and in September the TUSC steering committee agreed to resume standing candidates in the 2021 UK local elections. It stood further candidates in the 2022 UK local elections.

History

Foundation
At the March 2009 Socialist Party congress, RMT executive members Alex Gordon and Brian Denny addressed Socialist Party delegates in an official capacity, outlining the RMT's proposal for workers' slates in the European elections in June. At a later congress session this initiative was formally agreed by congress delegates, and No to EU – Yes to Democracy (NO2EU) was formed. NO2EU, an electoral alliance, headed by Bob Crow, between the RMT, the Communist Party of Britain and the Socialist Party, subsequently led to the formation of the Trade Unionist and Socialist Coalition. The Socialist Party, which had previously participated in the Socialist Alliance and Welsh Socialist Alliance and backed the Campaign for a New Workers' Party, termed No2EU "an important first step towards independent working class political representation", despite criticisms of the name and other minor issues. The Socialist Party stated it "would prefer a name that includes 'socialism', for marked ideological contrast to New Labour, and also one that makes it clear that the coalition is a working class alternative." Nevertheless, the Socialist Party noted the success of Die Linke in Germany, the New Anticapitalist Party in France and Coalition of the Radical Left in Greece, and emphasized the need for a "genuine socialist alternative" in the European elections.

After the European elections, in July 2009, the CPB released a statement expressing willingness to continue the No2EU programme and support left-wing alliance candidates in some constituencies, but also called for a vote for Labour Party candidates in others. However, on 17 January 2010 the Executive Committee of the Communist Party declined to formally participate in the coalition.

Negotiations to found the coalition continued over several months after the EU election. One proposed name for the coalition was "Trade Unionists and Green Socialists Alliance". The RMT, which had formally supported No2EU, initially decided, in January 2010, not to similarly back TUSC, but allowed individual branches to support it. It later gave TUSC candidates its full backing (see below). On 12 January 2010, the coalition was announced and subsequently, the RMT National Council of Executives supported 20 TUSC candidates on receipt of local RMT branch requests. TUSC chairperson Dave Nellist stood as a candidate for the coalition in the constituency of Coventry North East. Among the other candidates were Jackie Grunsell in Colne Valley constituency, Keith Gibson in Hull West and Hessle, Dave Hill in Brighton Kemptown, Ian Page in Lewisham Deptford, Rob Williams in Swansea West and Tim Cutter in Southampton Itchen.

Some political groups such as the Alliance for Workers Liberty and the Weekly Worker newspaper have argued that the coalition was formed in secret and without democratic input.

Meanwhile, just after the 2009 European Elections, the Socialist Workers Party, which had not taken part in No2EU but which had itself been part of the Socialist Alliance and the Respect Party, published its "Open Letter to the Left", in which it called for "a united fightback to save jobs and services" and subsequently joined TUSC; it left TUSC (England and wales) in 2017, but remained part of the autonomous Scottish TUSC for a time, before leaving entirely.

In July 2020, the Socialist Party called for the relaunch of the electoral alliance and in September the TUSC steering committee agreed to resume standing candidates in the 2021 UK local elections.

People's Alliance of the Left
On 20 January 2022, it was announced that a "memorandum of understanding" had been agreed between TUSC, the Breakthrough Party, the Northern Independence Party and Left Unity. This alliance, known as the People's Alliance of the Left (PAL) would see the four parties work together on a future electoral strategy. It did not last long, however, as TUSC was removed from PAL after its Steering Committee agreed "observer status" for the Workers Party of Britain, lead by George Galloway. In a statement, the NIP said that degrading statements made both by Galloway and other Workers Party members about women, non-binary people and immigration had made it impossible for TUSC to remain part of PAL.

Trade union interaction

Trade union endorsement
Three Annual General Meetings (2012, 2013 and 2014) of the National Union of Rail, Maritime and Transport Workers (RMT) have endorsed RMT support for TUSC candidates and the RMT is formally represented on the TUSC steering committee. TUSC has been endorsed by Bob Crow, formerly the General Secretary of the RMT, Brian Caton, former General Secretary of the Prison Officers' Association (POA), Steve Gillan and Joe Simpson, General Secretary and Assistant General Secretary of the POA, Janice Godrich, President of the Public and Commercial Services Union (PCS), Chris Baugh, Assistant General Secretary of the PCS and eight members of the UNISON National Executive Council.

Criticism from Unite the Union
In February 2015, senior figures from Unite the Union condemned the Socialist Party and by implication TUSC, for standing candidates against Labour in marginal constituencies for the 2015 general election. The open letter addressed to the Socialist Party, which does not mention TUSC, accuses the Socialist Party of having a "derisory" electoral record. In response, the Socialist Party claimed that a Labour government "would be at best austerity-lite and a continuation of the crisis that faces working class people".

Organisation
TUSC is an umbrella organisation with a federal structure. It has been registered as a political party with the Electoral Commission since 2010. All candidates supporting the coalition must support a core policy platform, but beyond this each candidate is free to campaign on the platform of their own political party.

All-Britain Steering Committee
Each of TUSC's constituent organisations is entitled to have representatives on the All-Britain Steering Committee, where they engage in decision-making regarding policy, strategy, and the selection of candidates. Until 2022, these organisations included, most notably, the RMT, the Socialist Party, the Socialist Party Scotland (Scottish TUSC), and the Resistance Movement. However, since 2022, the RMT is no longer affiliated with TUSC.

National and local steering committees
TUSC participants in Scotland are nationally organised with an autonomous Scottish TUSC Steering Committee. Additionally, local branches of TUSC each have their own steering committees established for local government areas and parliamentary constituencies where TUSC contests seats.

Current and past participating organisations
The following organisations have been involved in TUSC at various times:

 Trade unions
 the Fire Brigades Union (FBU)
 Napo, the family court and probation workers' union
 the National Education Union (NEU)
 the National Union of Rail, Maritime and Transport Workers (RMT) (left in 2022)
 the National Union of Teachers (NUT)
 the Prison Officers' Association (POA)
 the Public and Commercial Services Union (PCS)
 UNISON, the public services union
 the University and College Union (UCU)

 Other organisations
 DayMer
 Hull Red Labour
 the Labour Representation Committee
 Left Unity
 Leicester Independent Councillors Against the Cuts
 the Pan-African Congress
 the Resist Movement
 the Respect Party
 the Socialist Resistance
 the Socialist Party (England and Wales)
 the Socialist Party Scotland
 the Socialist Workers Party (left in 2017)
 Solidarity
 Southampton Councillors Against Cuts
 the United Socialist Party

Policies
TUSC launched its manifesto for the 2015 general election in London's financial district of Canary Wharf.

The TUSC registered with the Electoral Commission to campaign in favour of Britain leaving the European Union.

Five key pledges 
The 2015 manifesto outlines "five key pledges":

 End cuts and austerity. For a democratic socialist society run in the interests of the millions not the billionaires.
 Trade union rights to fight low pay. £10.12 an hour minimum wage now, scrap zero hour contracts.
 A mass council home building programme and immediate introduction of rent controls.
 Scrap student fees. Free education as a right for all.
 For democratic public ownership of the National Health Service, railways, public services, utilities and banks.

Local election platform 
TUSC local election candidates sign up to a platform, which commits them to:

 Oppose all cuts to council jobs, services, pay and conditions; reject the claim that ‘some cuts’ are necessary to services or that the national debt is a reason for austerity.
 Refuse to implement the Bedroom Tax now. Councils should write off all bedroom tax-related arrears, withdraw all court proceedings and eviction orders where the bedroom tax has been a factor, and call on Housing Associations to do the same.
 Support all workers’ struggles against the cuts, privatisation and government policies making ordinary people pay for the crisis caused by the bankers and the bosses. Defend the national collective bargaining arrangements for council workers.
 Reject increases in council tax, rent and service charges to compensate for government cuts.
 Vote against the privatisation of council jobs and services, or the transfer of council services to ‘social enterprises’ or ‘arms-length’ management organisations, which are first steps to privatisation.
 Oppose racism and fascism and stand up for equality for all.
 Campaign for the introduction of a Living Wage above the minimum wage, including for council employees and those working for council contractors.
 Use all the legal powers available to councils to oppose both the cuts and government policies which centrally impose the transfer of public services to private bodies. This includes using councils’ powers to refer local NHS decisions, initiate referendums and organise public commissions and consultations in campaigns to defend public services.
 Vote for councils to refuse to implement the cuts. Support councils which in the first instance use their reserves and prudential borrowing powers to avoid making cuts. [and] argue the best way to mobilise the mass campaign that is necessary to defeat the dismantling of council services is to set a budget that meets the needs of the local community and demands that government funding makes up the shortfall.
 Support action against climate change and for a future where sustainability comes before profit.

Elections

General elections

Summary of general election performance

2010 United Kingdom general election 

TUSC and the Scottish TUSC (STUSC) announced 44 parliamentary candidates for the 2010 general election, including ten in Scotland. They received a total of 15,573 votes, or 0.1% of the popular vote. TUSC's average vote nationwide was around 371 (1.0%); no deposits were returned. TUSC was registered with the Electoral Commission in January 2010.

TUSC claimed that the possibilities of electoral success should not be exaggerated. TUSC consistently stated that "not too much can be drawn from a handful of electoral contests, either ‘writing off’ TUSC or exaggerating the possibilities at this stage." Another claimed factor in 2010 was a perceived "squeeze" that generated disappointing results for many smaller parties. "Fear of a Tory government galvanised people to vote Labour, and we were squeezed. People were too afraid to demand something better for fear of getting something worse." Tottenham candidate Jenny Sutton claimed.

2015 United Kingdom general election 

TUSC stood 135 prospective parliamentary candidates across England, Wales and Scotland, as well as 619 council candidates in local elections.

The organisation announced in October 2014 that it had received a guarantee of funding from Socialist Alliance. The funds would provide for one hundred deposits in parliamentary contests, as well as a Party Political Broadcast.

The party performed badly at the election, winning 36,327 votes, or 0.1% of the popular vote. No parliamentary seats were gained and no deposits were saved.

2017 United Kingdom general election 

TUSC called for a victory for Labour in the 2017 general election and did not run candidates in the elections.

2019 United Kingdom general election

Local elections

2011 United Kingdom local elections 

TUSC stood 174 candidates in the May 2011 council elections. In 13 seats TUSC polled over 10% and in over a quarter polled more than 5%.

2011 National Assembly for Wales election 

TUSC stood a total number of 24 candidates out of two Welsh Assembly regions in the 2011 Welsh Assembly elections in which it came 10th place out of 11 parties in the South Wales West region with 809 votes (0.5%) and for the South Wales Central region, it came 11th place out of 12 parties with 830 votes (0.4%). It gained 1,639 votes in total with 0.2% nationwide.

2012 United Kingdom local elections 

TUSC stood 132 candidates in 38 councils, with 17 candidates for the Greater London Assembly. Two TUSC-backed candidates were elected, Michael Lavalette in Preston and Peter Smith in Walsall. In the council elections in England and Wales TUSC candidates averaged 6.2% of the poll. Tony Mulhearn, one of the 47 Liverpool Councillors who refused to set a budget for the council, and led a campaign of defiance of the Conservative government in the 1980s stood as the candidate for Mayor of Liverpool, coming fifth with 4.86% of the vote. In Scotland, 38 candidates stood in nine councils as the Scottish Anti-Cuts Coalition (SACC). The TUSC campaign for the Greater London Assembly was launched by Bob Crow of the RMT and Matt Wrack of the FBU, and candidates included Alex Gordon, President of the RMT trade union and April Ashley a member of the UNISON National Executive.

TUSC stood candidates in the 2012 by-elections for Manchester Central (garnering 1.3%), Middlesbrough (1.6%) and Rotherham (1.3%).

2013 United Kingdom local elections and by-elections 

A total of 120 candidates contested the English local elections on 2 May under the TUSC umbrella, 5% of the seats. In addition, TUSC stood a candidate in the Doncaster mayoral contest and two candidates in council by-elections that were held on the same day. It was mainly county councils up for election, largely Conservative controlled. The TUSC candidate for the mayor of Doncaster, Mary Jackson, polled 1,916 votes, achieving sixth place, ahead of the Liberal Democrats.

TUSC stood in the Eastleigh by-election. Candidate Daz Procter achieved 0.15% of the vote.
Up to mid-November 2013, TUSC had contested 27 council by-elections in 2013 (with candidates in place for ten more). TUSC's average percentage share of the vote in these seats was just under 6%. Joe Robinson won a seat for TUSC on Maltby Town Council.

2014 United Kingdom local elections 

TUSC announced the 'biggest left-of-Labour electoral challenge in 60 years' in the 2014 local elections, fielding 561 candidates. There were 53 candidates who were members of the RMT transport workers' union, 19 Communication Workers' Union members who were candidates, 18 members of the National Union of Teachers, 16 PCS members, 20 members of the University and College Union. From the big Labour-affiliated unions, there were 74 Unison members standing for TUSC and 130 members of Unite. TUSC gained two seats in Southampton with the defection of Don Thomas from Labour and the re-election of Keith Morrell, also previously Labour, as Councillors Against Cuts, as well as a second seat on Maltby Town Council. The overall popular votes achieved in the campaign exceeded 68,000.

TUSC lost its representation in Maltby in the autumn of 2014 with the removal of their two councillors for non-attendance, and lost its Preston councillor when Michael Lavalette retired his seat. However, TUSC gained two affiliated councillors in the shape of Hull Red Labour, following their expulsion from Labour in 2014. In January 2015, TUSC gained a councillor in Warrington (Fairfield and Howley ward) with the defection of Kevin Bennett from Labour.

2015 United Kingdom local elections 

TUSC renewed its promise to field the largest left-of-Labour challenge in the parliamentary and local authority elections. It bolstered its 2014 local election candidacy count by 70, bringing the total to 650. As it also fielded 135 PPCs, in every major town and city in England, Wales, and Scotland, TUSC subsequently exceeded the overall number of candidates to satisfy the BBC's fair coverage threshold, qualifying it for distribution of election material via the Royal Mail, as well as time on the major networks for the airing of a Party Election Broadcast.

TUSC gained no seats (and, in one ward, no votes) and lost three anti-cuts councillors in Leicester and Hull. They retain one affiliated councillor each in Warrington, Walsall and Hull, and two in Southampton.

2016 United Kingdom local elections 

Following the 2016 elections, TUSC had three councillors in Southampton under the banner of Coxford Putting People First, Kevin Bennett having lost his seat in Warrington; Hull Red Labour and Walsall Democratic Labour also lost their remaining seats.

2016 National Assembly for Wales election 

Welsh TUSC candidates obtained 2,040 Regional votes, 0.2% of the votes.

2017 United Kingdom local elections 

TUSC stood a total of 78 council candidates in 24 councils across England, Scotland and Wales, contesting 71 wards or divisions. TUSC also stood candidates in two of the eight Mayoral elections held on 4 May.

2018 United Kingdom local elections 

Following the 2018 elections, TUSC retained at least one affiliated councillor in Coxford, Southampton, following the re-election (as Independent - Putting People First) of TUSC national steering committee member Keith Morrell. Two other former Putting People First councillors also retain their seats as Independents, but the group has since dissolved. Morrell resigned in 2019.

2021 United Kingdom local elections 

TUSC claimed to have put up nearly 300 candidates in the 2021 UK local elections.

2022 Birmingham Erdington by-election 
Dave Nellist stood for TUSC in the 2022 Birmingham Erdington by-election, finished in third place on 2.1% with 360 votes, ahead of Reform UK, the Greens and the Liberal Democrats.

Electoral performance

Senedd elections

Scottish Parliament elections

London Assembly elections

References

External links
Trade Unionist and Socialist Coalition Official Website

2010 establishments in the United Kingdom
Anti-austerity political parties in the United Kingdom
Eurosceptic parties in the United Kingdom
Left-wing political party alliances
Organisations associated with the Labour Party (UK)
Political parties established in 2010
Political party alliances in the United Kingdom
Socialist Party (England and Wales)
Socialist Workers Party (UK)
United Kingdom